Max von Braunmühl is a German race car driver who competed in six Porsche Supercup races in 2004 for Team Herberth.

References

German racing drivers
Living people
Porsche Supercup drivers
Year of birth missing (living people)
Place of birth missing (living people)
21st-century German people